Asterivora is a genus of moths in the family Choreutidae. Asterivora was described by J. S. Dugdale in 1979. The type species is Asterivora combinatana.

Description 

Dugdale described the genus as follows:

Hosts 
Larvae of species within the genus Asterivora feed on Asteraceae, mainly on species in the genera Celmisia and Olearia. The larvae feed either on the underside of Celmisia or Olearia  leaves or in a loose cocoon made of silk and hidden in a rolled leaf of species in the genus Brachyglottis. One species, A. tillyardi, feeds on species of Raoulia growing in alpine habitats at altitudes above 1400 m.

Behaviour 
Adults of species within this genus are day flying.

Species
Asterivora albifasciata (Philpott, 1924)
Asterivora analoga (Meyrick, 1912)
Asterivora antigrapha (Meyrick, 1911)
Asterivora barbigera (Meyrick, 1915)
Asterivora chatuidea (Clarke, 1926)
Asterivora colpota (Meyrick, 1911)
Asterivora combinatana (Walker, 1863)
Asterivora exocha (Meyrick, 1907)
Asterivora fasciata (Philpott, 1930)
Asterivora homotypa (Meyrick, 1907)
Asterivora inspoliata (Philpott, 1930)
Asterivora iochondra (Meyrick, 1911)
Asterivora lampadias (Meyrick, 1907)
Asterivora marmarea (Meyrick, 1888)
Asterivora microlitha (Meyrick, 1888)
Asterivora ministra (Meyrick, 1912)
Asterivora nivescens (Philpott, 1926)
Asterivora oleariae Dugdale, 1979
Asterivora symbolaea (Meyrick, 1888)
Asterivora tillyardi (Philpott, 1924)
Asterivora tristis (Philpott, 1930)
Asterivora urbana (Clarke, 1926)

References

External links
Asterivora information at choreutidae.lifedesks.org

 
Choreutidae
Moths of New Zealand